Gods, Graves, and Scholars is a book by German writer C. W. Ceram about the history of archaeology. First published in 1949, Ceram's book introduced the general reading public to the origin and development of archaeology. It sold extremely well — over five million copies have been published in 30 languages — and remains in print today.

The book covers Greek, Egyptian, Mesopotamian, as well as Mexican, Central American, and South American archaeology. It gives brief biographies of archaeologists like Heinrich Schliemann, Jean-François Champollion, Paul-Émile Botta, and Howard Carter, among others.

The book inspired the graphic artist and satirist Hans Traxler to his "fairy-tale archaeological" parody The Truth about Hansel and Gretel, which was initially not recognized as a parody by numerous media and the public, and which depicts how the teacher Georg Ossegg allegedly archaeologically explores the witch's house of Hansel and Gretel. The book was also used as a source of inspiration for the book.

References
Robert Kanigel: Vintage reading: from Plato to Bradbury: A personal tour of some of the world's best books. Bancroft Press 1998, p. 116-117
Cornelius Holtorf: Archaeology is a brand!: the meaning of archaeology in contemporary popular culture. Archaeopress 2007, p. 68

1949 non-fiction books
Archaeology books